The 2014–15 Israel State Cup (Gvia HaMedina) was the 76th season of Israel's nationwide football cup competition and the 61st after the Israeli Declaration of Independence.

The competition began on 10 September 2014, with a fifth-round match between Hapoel Katamon and Hapoel Migdal HaEmek. The final was held in Sammy Ofer Stadium, Haifa on 20 May 2015.

The competition was won by Maccabi Tel Aviv, who had beaten Hapoel Be'er Sheva 6–2 in the final.

Format Changes
On 2 July 2014 the IFA approved a change of format so that the quarter-finals would be played as two-legged, home and away ties.

Preliminary rounds

First to fourth rounds
Rounds 1 to 4 double as league cup competition for each division in Liga Bet and Liga Gimel. The two third-round winners from each Liga Bet division and the fourth-round winner from each Liga Gimel division advance to the sixth round.

Liga Bet

Liga Bet North A

Hapoel Kafr Kanna won the district cup; Hapoel Kafr Kanna and Ahva Arraba qualified to the sixth round.

Liga Bet North B

Hapoel Baqa Ironi al-Gharbiyye won the district cup; Hapoel D. al-Karmel and Hapoel Baqa Ironi al-Gharbiyye qualified to the sixth round.

Liga Bet South A

Hapoel Nahlat Yehuda won the district cup; Hapoel Nahlat Yehuda and Beitar Petah Tikva qualified to the sixth round.

Liga Bet South B

Bnei Eilat won the district cup; F.C. Be'er Sheva and Bnei Eilat qualified to the sixth round.

Liga Gimel

Liga Gimel Upper Galilee

Maccabi Bnei Nahf won the district cup and qualified to the sixth round.

Liga Gimel Lower Galilee

F.C. Tzeirei Tamra won the district cup and qualified to the sixth round.

Liga Gimel Jezreel

Ihud Bnei Baqa won the district cup and qualified to the sixth round.

Liga Gimel Shomron

F.C. Haifa won the district cup and qualified to the sixth round.

Liga Gimel Sharon

Beitar Tubruk won the district cup and qualified to the sixth round.

Liga Gimel Tel Aviv

Hapoel Kiryat Shalom won the district cup and qualified to the sixth round.

Liga Gimel Center

F.C.Holon won the district cup and qualified to the sixth round.

Liga Gimel South

Semi-finals

Final

Top scorers

Notes

References

External links
 Israel Football Association website 

Israel State Cup
State Cup
Israel State Cup seasons